Queen Christina or Queen Christine may refer to:

Queens regnant 
 Christina, Queen of Sweden (1626–1689), Queen regnant of Sweden, reigned 1632–1654

Queens consort 
Christina of Denmark, Queen of Norway ( 1118–1139), Queen consort of Norway, spouse of King Magnus IV of Norway
Christina of Denmark, Queen of Sweden ( 1120/25–1170), Queen consort of Sweden, spouse of King Eric IX of Sweden
Christina Hvide ( 1145– 1200), Queen consort of Sweden, spouse of King Charles VII of Sweden
Christina of Norway (died 1213), titular queen consort of Norway, spouse of co-regent King Philip Simonsson
Christina Abrahamsdotter (1432–1492), Queen consort of Sweden, spouse of King Charles VIII of Sweden
Christina of Saxony (1461–1521), Queen consort of Denmark, Sweden and Norway, spouse of King John of Denmark
Christina of Holstein-Gottorp (1573–1625), Queen consort of Sweden, spouse of King Charles IX of Sweden

See also 
Queen Christina (film) – a 1933 film loosely based upon the life of Queen Christina of Sweden, starring Greta Garbo.

Christina